TAT Technologies is a publicly traded Israeli company, headquartered in Gedera, Israel, that provides environmental control products and services for the commercial and military aviation industries. Its shares are traded on the NASDAQ Capital Market and on the Tel Aviv Stock Exchange.

Operations 
TAT Technologies is a manufacturer of environmental control systems for the commercial and military aviation industries. The systems it provides include heat exchangers and cooling systems, essential for the operation of aircraft machinery and electronics, as well as air conditioners for use in military installations and in armored vehicles. TAT's clients have included the United States Army, Boeing, Lockheed Martin, Cirrus Aircraft, and Embraer. The company's competitors include AMETEK, Honeywell International and Hamilton Sundstrand.

Subsidiaries 
 Limco Airepair Inc. – manufacturer of heat transfer equipment.
 Piedmont Aviation Component Services LLC – provider of component maintenance and aircraft overhaul. Headquartered in Kernersville, North Carolina, the company's roots date back to the 1940s.
 Turbochrome LTD – provider of jet engine component maintenance. Headquartered in Kiryat Gat, the company's was founded in 1969 as a joint venture between Chromalloy and Israel Aerospace Industries.

History 
TAT Technologies was founded in 1969 by Shlomo Ostersetzer in response to a French arms embargo on combatants in the Six-Day War – an embargo that primarily affected Israel. The company was established with the goal of replacing the French aviation industry, upon which Israel had relied extensively until that time. TAT has been listed on the NASDAQ American stock exchange since 1987 and joined the Tel Aviv Stock Exchange in 2005. In 2007 the ownership of TAT was acquired from Ostersetzer and partner Dov Zeelim by Isal, a subsidiary of KMN Holdings, controlled by Roni Elroy, son-in-law of Yitzhak Tshuva.

Acquisitions

See also 
 France–Israel relations
 Lockheed Martin F-35 Lightning II
 Thermal management of electronic devices and systems
 List of Israeli companies quoted on the Nasdaq

References 

Defense companies of Israel
Aerospace companies
Manufacturing companies established in 1969
Technology companies established in 1969
Companies listed on the Nasdaq
Companies listed on the Tel Aviv Stock Exchange